Stefan Hengst (born 17 March 1994) is a German slalom canoeist who has competed at the international level since 2011.

He won three medals at the ICF Canoe Slalom World Championships with two golds (Extreme K1: 2019, K1 team: 2022) and a bronze (Extreme K1: 2022). He also won three medals (1 silver and 2 bronzes) in the K1 team event at the European Championships.

World Cup individual podiums

1 World Championship counting for World Cup points

References

External links

Living people
German male canoeists
1994 births
Medalists at the ICF Canoe Slalom World Championships
Sportspeople from Hamm